Ngāti Maniapoto is an iwi (tribe) based in the Waikato-Waitomo region of New Zealand's North Island. It is part of the Tainui confederation, the members of which trace their whakapapa (genealogy) back to people who arrived in New Zealand on the waka (canoe) Tainui. The 2018 New Zealand census reports show an estimated population of 45,930 people who affiliated with Maniapoto, making it the 9th biggest iwi in New Zealand.

History

Ngāti Maniapoto trace their lineage to their eponymous ancestor Maniapoto, an 11th generation descendant of the people who arrived on the Tainui waka and settled at the Kawhia Harbour. His father Rereahu led the Tainui expansion to the interior of the Waikato region, and Maniapoto settled in the southern Waikato area. Maniapoto's older brother Te Ihinga-a-rangi settled at Maungatautari, forming the Ngāti Hauā and Ngāti Korokī Kahukura iwi.

Hapū and marae

There are many marae (area in front of a wharenui) in the Ngāti Maniapoto area, one of the notable ones being Te Tokanga Nui A Noho at Te Kuiti (the narrowing) in the King Country. This whare was given to Ngāti Maniapoto by Te Kooti, a Rongowhakaata guerilla fighter who lived in the region for the period while on the run from colonial forces which undertook searches for him during the New Zealand Wars. Of equal significance but less publicly known is Tiroa Pā where the last Io whare wānanga (traditional study centre) was held in a specially crafted whare called Te Whetu Marama o Hinawa at Te Miringa Te Kakara. The other whare wānanga was near present-day Piopio and was called Kahuwera. It stood on the hill of the same name and commanded a panoramic view of the Mokau River valley across the Maraetaua block.

 Ngāti Rora
 Ngāti Hinewai
 Ngāti Taiawa or Taewa
 Ngāti Kaputuhi
 Ngāti Kinohaku
 Ngāti Ngutu
 Ngāti Mokau
 Ngāti Hikairo
 Ngāti Apakura
 Ngāti Matakore
 Ngāti Raukawa
 Ngāti Utu
 Ngati Urunumia
 Ngāti Paretekawa
Ngati Parewaeono
 Ngāti Waiora
 Ngāti Hari
 Ngāti Uekaha
 Ngāti Rangatahi
 Ngati Peehi

Ngāti Te Kanawa

Ngāti Te Kanawa is an iwi based in Taumarunui and one of the forty main hapu of the Ngāti Maniapoto confederation, which came into existence around 1860. They trace their whakapapa to the tupuna (ancestor) Te Kanawa, who was the great-great-great grandson of the tupuna Maniapoto and comes off Uruhina (daughter of Rungaterangi and Pareraukawa). The families who carry the name Te Kanawa today have a direct male blood line whakapapa to the tupuna Te Kanawa, also known as Te Kanawa Pango.

Notable people

 Wiremu Te Awhitu, Catholic priest
 Sandor Earl, league player
 Mihi Edwards, memoirist, social worker, teacher and kaumātua
 Taonui Hikaka, Paramount chief
 Dame Rangimārie Hetet, famous weaver and fabric artist
 Dr Pei Te Hurinui Jones, academic and writer
 Richard Kahui, rugby union player
 Dame Kiri Te Kanawa, opera singer
 Rewi Manga Maniapoto, warrior chief
 Temuera Morrison, actor
 Pania Newton, activist
 Earl Nikora, boxer
 Puhiwahine, composer
 Tiki Taane, singer
 Rongo Wetere, educator
 Wahanui, negotiator chief
 Derek Kōtuku Totorewa Wooster, broadcaster

References

External links
 Maniapoto Trust Board
 Ngati Maniapoto Marae Pact Trust
 Ngāti Maniapoto in Te Ara: The Encyclopedia of New Zealand